Yasukand (also Romanized as Yāsūkand; also known as Ḩasanābād-e Yāsūkand, Hasan Ābād-e-Sowgand, Ḩasanābād-e Sūgand, and Korānī) is a city and capital of Korani District, in Bijar County, Kurdistan Province, Iran. At the 2006 census, its population was 3,268, in 917 families. The city is populated by Turkics.

References

Towns and villages in Bijar County
Cities in Kurdistan Province
Azerbaijani settlements in Kurdistan Province